Kizzy Meriel Crawford (born 1996), known as Kizzy, is a Welsh singer songwriter from Merthyr Tydfil with Bajan heritage who sings in both English and Welsh, using traditional and modern sources. She began writing songs at the age of thirteen.

Background
Kizzy was born in Oxford but when her parents divorced in 1999, moved with her mother, sister and grandparents to Aberaeron and later Llandeilo before settling in Merthyr Tydfil, Her mother is from the south east of England but she spent her childhood holidays with her grandparents in Disserth, Powys and always wanted to raise her children in Wales.

Her father's family hails from Barbados.

She was educated in Welsh from the age of four and is the eldest of five children. She has a sister, Eädyth, who is also a singer.

In a 2013 press interview she explained: 

At the age of 26 she was diagnosed with autism.

Career
Crawford won the Arts Connect Original Singer-Songwriter prize in 2012 resulting in work with Amy Wadge including recording her first single Starling and its video with Arts Connect's Sonig - youth music industry initiative.

She performed her song "The Starling" live on BBC Radio Wales's Bethan Elfyn Show in August 2013. This was then released as her debut single in November 2013 followed by her EP Temporary Zone in December, released by Cardiff record label See Monkey Do Monkey. Together with many radio and TV appearances in Wales during 2013, she has also performed live at various venues including FOCUS Wales Festival, the Sŵn festival, the Green Man Festival, Caerphilly Castle and Maes B at the National Eisteddfod of Wales. Crawford also performed at Festival No 6.

In 2014, she signed to publishing company BDi Music.

Crawford appeared on the BBC Wales 6 nations 2014 promotions singing Calon Lân, and in April 2014 was named as one of twelve BBC Horizons acts for 2014–15.

She performed her new single "Golden Brown", and also Calon Lân, live on BBC Radio 4's Saturday Live programme on 20 September 2014 Later that year she performed at Glastonbury on the BBC Introducing stage and has since performed at several other high-profile festivals including Womex Blissfields, Hay Festival and Cheltenham Jazz.

In 2015, she released the single "Shout Out / Yr Alwad", a co-write with Owen Powell, the track was selected as the soundtrack to the Visit Wales 2015 National TV & Online Campaign.

Crawford performed at the Euro 16 Welsh team homecoming gig at Cardiff City Football Stadium alongside the Manic Street Preachers.

In 2016, several of her compositions were selected as part of the WJEC A Level Music Syllabus - her music sat in the contemporary section alongside The Manics, Gruff Rhys & The Super Furry Animals. Later Crawford was invited to perform and discuss that accolade live on Woman's Hour for BBC Radio 4.

Later in 2016, Crawford collaborated with Jazz pianist and composer Gwilym Simcock on a new collaboration Birdsong - Can Yr Adar, based on the Welsh rainforest within Carngafallt. They co-wrote new music and performed and toured it live with Sinfonia Cymru across Wales and culminating in a performance at London Jazz Festival. In 2018, the Birdsong-Can Yr Adar CD was released via Basho Records to coincide with a second UK tour. The recording was listed as a Top 100 2018 album by renowned jazz journalist Ted Gioia.

In 2017, she performed live with BBC National Orchestra of Wales and at Cambridge Folk Festival. She played a supporting role as PC Emma Jones in the award winning BBC drama Keeping Faith.

In 2018, Crawford signed to Freestyle Records and released her debut album "The Way I Dream" in 2019

In November 2021, Crawford released her first self recorded/produced/mixed and debut Welsh Album "Rhydd" with Sain Records.

Politics
In September 2019, Crawford sang Calon Lân with her sister, Eädyth, at a rally in Merthyr Tydfil expressing her support for Welsh independence by YesCymru.

Discography
 "The Starling" (Soig, 2013)
 "Temporary Zone" (See Monkey Do Monkey, 2013)
 "Golden Brown" (2014)
 "Shout Out / Yr Alwad" (2015)
 "Pili Pala" (2015)
 "Imago" (2015)
 "Birdsong / Can Yr Adar" (Basho Records, 2018)
 "The Way I Dream" (Freestyle Records, 2019)
 "Rhydd" (Sain Records, 2021)

References

External links
 

1996 births
Living people
British women guitarists
Welsh folk musicians
Welsh guitarists
Welsh women songwriters
People from Merthyr Tydfil
Welsh-language singers
Welsh-speaking musicians
21st-century British guitarists
21st-century Welsh women singers
21st-century Black British women singers
Welsh people of Barbadian descent
Welsh jazz musicians
Welsh pop musicians
Welsh television actresses
Black British actresses
Basho Records artists
People on the autism spectrum
21st-century women guitarists